The 2019 Hank Steinbrecher Cup was the seventh edition of the United States Adult Soccer Association's (USASA) tournament whose winner is recognized with the title of U.S. National Amateur Champions.

USL League Two (USL L2) side Flint City Bucks are the defending champion.

Host selection
Milwaukee Bavarian SC was selected to host the tournament.

Teams
The tournament featured the 2018 USASA National Amateur Cup winner Milwaukee Bavarian SC and the defending Steinbrecher Cup winner Flint City Bucks, rebranded from Michigan Bucks. Ordinarily the tournament would have featured the 2018 PDL champion Calgary Foothills FC and the 2018 National Professional Soccer League (NPSL) champion Miami FC 2, but Calgary was ineligible due to being based in Canada and Miami was ineligible due to being a professional club. In their place, PDL runner-up Reading United AC and NPSL runner-up FC Motown were invited. Chicago FC United 2018 PDL National Semi-Finalist took the USL League 2 spot after Reading elected not to participate.

Matches

Bracket
The semifinal draw was held on March 1.

* = after extra time

Semifinals

Third-Place Match

Final

See also
2018 NPSL season
2018 PDL season

References

External links
 Official USASA website

2019